Mauck, an Americanized form of German Mauch or a German variant of Mauk, may refer to:

People
Carl Mauck (born 1947), former American football player
Hal Mauck (1869–1921), Major League Baseball pitcher
Matt Mauck (born 1979), former American football player

Places
Mauck, Virginia, an unincorporated community in Page County

German-language surnames
Americanized surnames